Italian Lessons is a novel by Peter Pezzelli. It was published in trade paperback by Kensington Publishing on October 1, 2007.

Reception

Publishers Weekly reviewed the book saying Pezzelli "brings his fans a light if sometimes trite story of two lovelorn men who form an unlikely friendship...  Pezzelli makes readers want to believe in love at first sight, and his earnest storytelling should win over its share of readers."

Ron Terpening in Library Journal described the book as telling "an engaging story that is as leisurely paced and satisfying as a fine Italian meal".

References

2007 American novels
Novels set in Providence, Rhode Island